Clapper or Clappers may refer to:

Miscellaneous
Clapper, part of a bell
Clapper (musical instrument), consisting of two pieces of wood struck together
Clapper bridge, an ancient form of bridge
Clapper Post, urban postal service of Vienna (XVIII century)
Clapperboard, used in film production to aid synchronizing audio and video and to identify different shots
The Clapper, a sound activated electrical switch

Arts and entertainment
Clappers (record label), a New York-based reggae label
"Clappers" (song), a 2013 song by Wale
The Clapper (film), a 2017 American comedy film

Places
Clapper, Missouri, a community in the United States
Clappers, Scottish Borders, a small village in Scottish Borders, Scotland

People
Billy Clapper  (born 1982), American basketball coach 
James Clapper (born 1941), former Director of National Intelligence of the United States
Clapper, a character in the video game Donkey Kong Country 2: Diddy's Kong Quest

See also
 ACLU v. Clapper, a lawsuit involving the American Civil Liberties Union
 Clapper v. Amnesty International USA, a United States Supreme Court case